D. Vijaya Kumar (born 26 April 1980) is an Indian film playback singer. He is mostly referred to as Vijay Urs. He has won the Sarvashreshta Kalabhusana award from department of Kannada & Culture, Karnataka. His 
Profession is Music,   passion is farming. He has recorded over 5000 songs in devotional and folk, private albums.

Early life
Vijay Urs was born to Devaraj Urs and Laxmamani Urs, Mysore, Karnataka. He has one brother and two sisters. He has completed his B.Com, Diploma in Personal Management and Post graduation in Industrial Management. He has completed classical courses and is a carnatic senior.

Personal life
Vijay Urs is married and has one daughter.

Career
Vijay Urs has started his career by releasing an album, Bhavabindu, lyrics written by himself. He has sung over 5000 songs in Devotional and Folk in Kannada. He is known for his songs in 45 movies. He has sung for almost every music director, namely Hamsalekha, Gurukiran, Arjun Janya, Hari Krishna, Keeravani and so on.
He has written more than 1000 songs which are now in market, Bhavageethe and Devotional. He is recognised as a member of IPRS (Indian Performing Rights Society). He is a recognised singer on Saavn and Gaana apps.

He has sung many songs with S. P. Balasubrahmanyam, Manu, Nandita, Shamita and many more. He has been performing orchestra since 1998 and has completed more than 3000 shows all over India, mainly in South India.
He is also known for his songs in Telugu serials being Varudu Kaavali the first. He has also sung in Tamil for 3 movies and some devotional songs.

Songs

References

Gallery

1980 births
Living people
Bhajan singers
Indian male playback singers
Kannada playback singers
Tamil playback singers
Telugu playback singers
Singers from Mysore